Deborah Salvatori Rinaldi (born 2 September 1991) is an Italian footballer who plays as a forward for Serie A club Pomigliano and the Italy women's national team.

References

1991 births
Living people
Sportspeople from the Province of Pescara
Footballers from Abruzzo
Italian women's footballers
Women's association football forwards
Serie A (women's football) players
Fiorentina Women's F.C. players
Florentia San Gimignano S.S.D. players
A.C. Milan Women players
Primera División (women) players
RCD Espanyol Femenino players
Italy women's international footballers
Italian expatriate footballers
Italian expatriate sportspeople in Spain
Expatriate women's footballers in Spain
Pomigliano C.F. players
ACF Firenze players